AMOC or Amoc may refer to:

 Atlantic meridional overturning circulation, current in the Atlantic Ocean 
 Alaska Mission Operations Center, a US National Security Agency base
 Amoc (rapper), a Finnish Sámi rapper
 Aston Martin Owners Club, a car enthusiasts' club